Raphael Hostey (1992 – May 2016), also known as Abu Qaqa, was a British Islamic State of Iraq and the Levant recruiter and fighter from Manchester.

Born Raphel Saiho A Hostey. Hostey was a rapper and graphic design student at Liverpool John Moores University when he left his wife and child to join ISIS in 2013.

He is believed to have been killed in an airstrike in Syria.

See also
Abu Qaqa

References

External links
Raphael Hostey profile at counterextremism.com

1992 births
2016 deaths
British Muslims
Islamic State of Iraq and the Levant and the United Kingdom
Islamic State of Iraq and the Levant members
Deaths by airstrike during the Syrian civil war